Bulgarian law is a largely civil law system, based on epitomes in French law and German law. It retains increasingly fewer elements of Soviet law. This makes the state's approach to criminal law inquisitorial rather than adversarial, and is generally characterised by an insistence on formality and rationality.

Commercial law is of an increasingly good drafting quality and the markets in Bulgarian legal services, that are slower to emerge than those elsewhere in Central and Eastern Europe, are becoming more competitive.

See also 
 Constitution of Bulgaria

References 
 World Factbook of Criminal Justice Systems, 
 Freedom House on the effectiveness of the Bulgarian system

External links